The Night Climbers of Oxford is a secret society, dedicated to nocturnally scaling college and town buildings in Oxford, England. The society is noted for its political activism, controversial acts, feats of climbing and parkour, as well as urban exploration. The society was likely inspired by their Cambridge counterparts, The Night Climbers of Cambridge. Activities conducted by the society are forbidden by the University authorities, meaning that acts are completed under the cover of darkness, to avoid detection.

History 
The founding date of the Night Climbing society remains unknown, although acts of nocturnal climbing in Oxford are reported to date back to the 1930s, with members of the Alpine Club and Oxford University Mountaineering Club being some of the first to venture on to the University rooftops. The historian and climber David Cox, is widely regarded as one of the first night climbers to have scaled the Radcliffe Camera and the Codrington Library, during the early 1930s. Upon his second ascent of the Radcliffe Camera, he was accompanied by fellow climber Nully Kretschmer. As an undergraduate, Cox stole the weather vane from the Christopher Wren Sundial, located in All Souls College. Upon being elected a fellow, he climbed back up and replaced it, with its absence unnoticed. Tom Tower located at Christ Church, Oxford is also reported to have first been scaled in the 1940s by undergraduate students.  

Hamish Nicol, a mountaineer, participated in acts of night climbing. After completing his National Service from 1947-49 when he was commissioned in the Royal Artillery, he attended Balliol College, Oxford, where he switched from Geology to Medicine. During his studies in Oxford, Nicol placed a white bow tie on top of the Radcliffe Camera to celebrate the Coronation of Elizabeth II.

Despite Oxford hosting similar architecture to that of Cambridge, night climbing activities remained sporadic in nature throughout the 1960s and 1970s. This was likely due to the combination of Oxford University Mountaineering Club senior members and Presidents, discouraging acts of night climbing. Additionally the brick work within Oxford is supposedly renowned for its fragile and soft nature, making climbs on listed or College buildings dangerous. For these reasons, no formal society dedicated to Night Climbing is thought to have gained any traction or structure during the late 20th century.

Whilst an undergraduate at St Catherine's College from 2005 - 2008, Katherine Rundell developed an interest in night climbing and began to explore the rooftops, inspired by the 1937 book The Night Climbers of Cambridge according to her diary. Rundell would later publish the book Rooftoppers, which followed the adventures of Sophie, a girl orphaned in a shipwreck on her first birthday. Sophie later attempts to find her mother, who she is convinced survived the disaster, whilst also taking to the rooftops of Paris in order to thwart officials trying to send her to a British orphanage.

The early 21st Century has seen an increase in the number of night-climbing activities based in Oxford. From 2016 to 2020, a group of nocturnal climbers began posting images to anonymous confession Facebook pages such as Oxfess, detailing climbs conducted at The Radcliffe Camera, Christ Church, Corpus Christi College, Pembroke College, Westgate, Cornmarket Street, and several other high-profile locations. Each public post contained content of a political or philosophical nature, with advice given sometimes in the form of an 'agony aunt'. The local media dubbed the group "The Night Climbers of Oxford", for their identities remained unknown. Despite some backlash, the public showed support for the group and their controversial acts. As a result they quickly became part of Oxford's urban and night-life culture. The modern incarnation is thought to be a mixed gender society, unlike their Cambridge counterparts. It is not exclusive to members of Oxford University, and consists of those who are physically talented in sports such as Rock Climbing and Parkour.

Political activism  

During May 2018, traffic cones began to litter the exterior walls of the Radcliffe Camera. The Night Climbers of Oxford claimed responsibility through anonymous Oxfess Facebook submissions. The Traffic Cones were detailed with humorous content, supposedly designed to put students in a 'light-hearted' frame of mind. During Oxford's pride week the traffic cones were decorated with Rainbow flags, showing the secret society's clear support for the movement. Other key political issues that are often pursued by the Night Climbers is that of inequality, elitism, and the homeless epidemic in Oxford.

Trespassing and controversy 
In April 2017, Merton Street was shut and fire tenders were called after several Corpus Christi College students climbed onto the roof, following a 'Bop'. All but one all of the students escaped from the porters, while one had to be rescued by the fire service. Eyewitness reports indicate the students crawled along a first-floor gutter in order to reach the slate roof of the main Quad. It is unclear how the students reached the gutter, but they were quickly spotted by porters and a Junior Dean.

Upon speaking with the Cherwell student newspaper, David Bray, Fire Protection and Business Safety Manager for Oxfordshire Fire and Rescue Service, released a statement saying: "They had placed themselves at great danger, considering that they were over four storeys above street level, and the slightest slip may have had disastrous consequences, which could have, at best, involved life-changing injuries."

In an email to JCR members, seen by Cherwell, the Dean of Corpus Christi, Dr David Russell, described climbing on college buildings as “extraordinarily dangerous”, noting the “seriousness” of the ban on climbing and concluding that the ground was "unforgiving.”

In January 2017, Christ Church students were issued with a safety warning after roof alarms were triggered by a night- climbing incident. The Night Climbers of Oxford confirmed to the Cherwell student newspaper, that two of their members had scaled Christ Church within the same time frame, coinciding with the incident. Professor Geraldine Johnson, the college’s junior censor, warned students to “make sure you don’t let anyone use your windows to access either the scaffolding or roof areas of the College.” The Night Climbers informed Cherwell that Christ Church was the easiest college to "both climb and infiltrate", due to the many obscure entrances on the grounds.

College authorities expressed their concerns, highlighting the dangers of climbing on college buildings, despite not condemning the act of night climbing itself.

Popular culture 

In more recent years, guides, books, plays and films have depicted the night-climbing/roof-climbing culture within Oxford. They are as follows:

In 2007,  Stephen Massicotte and R. H. Thomson printed the book The Oxford Roof Climber's Rebellion. This book inventively expands on the friendship between T. E. Lawrence and Robert Graves, suffering from the aftermath of World War I and foreseeing the dawning of new ones. This prompts the Oxford Night Climbers to lay siege to the university and town buildings, placing an Arabian flag on a roof at Oxford. The film was later converted into a theatrical production, produced by the Urban Stages company.

In 2014, The Riot Club depicts students scaling the town buildings surrounding the High Street. Directed by Lone Scherfig and written by Laura Wade, the film is set amongst the privileged elite of Oxford University, following the story of Miles (Max Irons) and Alistair (Sam Claflin), two first-year students determined to join the infamous Riot Club. The Riot Club is described as a veiled version of the real-life Bullingdon Club.

See also 

 Parkour
 Freerunning
 Buildering
 Traditional climbing
 The Night Climbers of Cambridge
 Dérive
 Urban exploration
 Noel Symington
 Geoffrey Winthrop Young
 Nick Raynsford
 Secret society

References

External links 
 Christ Church Students Warned About Night Climbing, The Cherwell, 27 January 2018
 Merton Street Shut After Corpus Boppers Take to the Roof, The Cherwell, 29 April 2017
 Obituary, Hamish Nicol, The Independent, 11 July 1997
 'We're not heroes': An interview with the Night Climbers of Oxford, The ISIS Magazine, 7 June 2018
 The Oxford Alpine Club
 8 Things You Might Not Know about Oxford and Cambridge - Night Climbers



Political activism
Urban exploration
Secret societies in the United Kingdom
Organisations based in Oxford